Leghorn may refer to:
 Livorno, an Italian port city in Tuscany, traditionally known in English as Leghorn
 Leghorn chicken, a breed of chicken from Tuscany
 The naval Battle of Leghorn, 1653, during the First Anglo-Dutch War

See also